The Secretary for Overseas Trade  was a junior Ministerial position in the United Kingdom government from 1917 until 1953, subordinate to the President of the Board of Trade. The office was replaced by the Minister of State for Trade on 3 September 1953.

Secretaries for Overseas Trade, 1917-1953

Overseas Trade
Defunct ministerial offices in the United Kingdom
1917 establishments in the United Kingdom
1953 disestablishments in the United Kingdom